Josephite Sister Maria Sullivan did mission work in Maria Comboni Mission, Mapuordit, southern Sudan and founded the Josephite Community Aid in 1986.

References

Female Roman Catholic missionaries
Year of birth missing
Nationality missing
Roman Catholic missionaries in South Sudan
Australian Roman Catholic missionaries
20th-century Australian Roman Catholic nuns
Sisters of St Joseph of the Sacred Heart
Possibly living people